Pablo Daniel Cano Fernández (born March 11, 1961, in Havana, Cuba) is a Miami-based artist. He creates marionettes which he uses in performances and exhibits as sculptures.

Selected solo exhibitions
"Pablo Cano: Pupil Progress" at the Meeting Point Art Center, Coral Gables, Florida (1980)
"Project Saussaies Vernissage", Paris, France (1983)
"Animated Altarpieces", Master of Fine Art Exhibition Queens College, New York City (1986)
"The Pursuit of Love", Nye Gómez Gallery, Baltimore, Maryland, U.S.A (1992).
"Puppet theatre", Young At Art Museum, Davie, Florida, U.S.A (2011).
"Pablo Cano - To The Eye Behind The Keyhole" Retrospective 1979 - 2016, Main Public Library, Miami, Fl (2016)

Collections
Cano's work is held in the collections of the Cintas Foundation. His work is also part of permanent collections of The Lowe Art Museum University of Miami, Florida, the NSU Museum of Art, Fort Lauderdale, Florida, The Perez Art Museum Miami, Florida, The Young At Art Museum, Davie, Florida, Museum of Contemporary Art, North Miami, Florida.

Awards
 Best in Show, Wolfson Campus, Miami Dade Community College, Miami, Florida, U.S.A, 1979.
 Channel 2 Art Auction Award, Miami, Florida, U.S.A, 1980
 Cintas Foundation Fellowship, New York, U.S.A, 1983-1984
Miami Dade College Hall of Fame Award 2005

References

Further reading
 El Nuevo Herald, La Ciudad Submarina by Alfredo Triff; December 12, 2006
 The Miami Herald, The Artful Puppeteer Pablo Cano Creates a World of Art and Fantasy by Lydia Martin; November 20, 2006

External links
 http://www.canoart.com/

American contemporary artists
Cuban emigrants to the United States
1961 births
Living people